Sporting Clube de Lamego (abbreviated as SC Lamego) is a Portuguese football club based in Lamego in the district of Viseu.

Background
SC Lamego currently plays in the Terceira Divisão Série B which is the fourth tier of Portuguese football. The club was founded in 1934 and they play their home matches at the Estádio dos Remédios in Lamego. The stadium is able to accommodate 3,500 spectators.

The club is affiliated to Associação de Futebol de Viseu and has competed in the AF Viseu Taça. The club has also entered the national cup competition known as Taça de Portugal on numerous occasions.

Season to season

League and cup history

Honours
AF Viseu Divisão Honra: 1954/55, 1961/62, 1965/66, 1967/68, 1981/82, 1984/85, 1986/87, 1991/92, 2010/11
AF Viseu 1ª Divisão: 1958/59
AF Viseu Taça: 	1990/91, 1991/92

Footnotes

External links
Official website 

Football clubs in Portugal
Association football clubs established in 1934
1934 establishments in Portugal
Sport in Lamego